The 1905–06 Welsh Amateur Cup was the sixteenth season of the Welsh Amateur Cup. The cup was won by Buckley Engineers who defeated Porthmadog 3-1 in a replayed final, at Welshpool.

First round

Second round

Third round

Fourth round

Semi-final

Final

References

1905-06
Welsh Cup
1905–06 domestic association football cups